The 2016 Internazionali di Tennis del Friuli Venezia Giulia was a professional tennis tournament played on clay courts. It was the thirteenth edition of the tournament which was part of the 2016 ATP Challenger Tour. It took place in Cordenons, Italy between 15 and 21 August 2016.

Singles main-draw entrants

Seeds

 1 Rankings are as of August 8, 2016.

Other entrants
The following players received wildcards into the singles main draw:
  Paolo Lorenzi
  Gianluca Mager
  Gianluigi Quinzi
  Matteo Donati

The following player received entry into the singles main draw using a protected ranking:
  Fabiano de Paula

The following player entered as an alternate:
  Jan Mertl

The following players received entry from the qualifying draw:
  Andrea Collarini
  Antonio Šančić
  Carlos Taberner
  Walter Trusendi

The following player received entry as a lucky loser:
  Sadio Doumbia

Champions

Singles

  Taro Daniel def.  Daniel Gimeno Traver, 6–3, 6–4

Doubles

  Andre Begemann /  Aliaksandr Bury def.  Roman Jebavý /  Zdeněk Kolář, 5–7, 6–4, [11–9]

External links
Official Website

Internazionali di Tennis del Friuli Venezia Giulia
Internazionali di Tennis del Friuli Venezia Giulia
Zucchetti